Expressways of Pakistan are a network of multiple-lane, high-speed toll highways in Pakistan, which are owned, maintained and operated by various levels of government. All federal expressways are controlled by the National Highway Authority, while others are provincially and municipally controlled. Expressways are usually higher grades than national highways, but differ from motorways by having fewer access restrictions. All federal expressways are pre-fixed with the letter 'E' (for "expressway") followed by the unique numerical designation of the specific highway (with a hyphen in the middle).

List of federal expressways

List of provincial expressways 
 Swat Expressway (Fatehpur, Swat and Nowshera)

List of municipal expressways 
 Lyari Expressway (Karachi)
 Gwadar East Bay Expressway
 Faisalabad Canal Expressway
 Malir Expressway
 Mauripur Expressway
 Lai Expressway (Islamabad and Rawalpindi)
 Lahore Ring Road

Map

See also

 National Highways of Pakistan
 Motorways of Pakistan
 Speed limits in Pakistan
 Transport in Pakistan

References

External links
 National Highway Authority
 Pakistan National Highways & Motorway Police 

Expressways